Highway 152 (AR 152, Ark. 152, and Hwy. 152) is a designation for three segments of state highway in Arkansas County, Arkansas. One route of  begins at US Highway 79 (US 79) near Humphrey and runs east to US 165. A third route of  begins at US 165 and AR 267, and the Great River Road (GRR) and runs east to Highway 17. All routes are maintained by the Arkansas State Highway and Transportation Department (AHTD).

Route description

Humphrey to US 165
AR 152 begins at US 79 east of Humphrey in western Arkansas County on the Grand Prairie. The route winds south and east, crossing Crooked Bayou and Bayou Meto just northeast of the Bayou Meto Wildlife Management Area. The highway serves as the southern terminus of AR 343 before terminating at US 165.

DeWitt
AR 152 begins in DeWitt at US 165 and runs due east as 2nd Street along the southern edge of the DeWitt Commercial Historic District. The route passes a residential neighborhood before intersecting AR 130 (Monroe Street). Continuing east, AR 152 passes through the southern part of downtown DeWitt before terminating at AR 1B.

US 165 to DeLuce
The route begins at US 165 in southern Arkansas County. AR 152 runs east through rural territory, passing through the unincorporated community of Prairie Union before an intersection with a discontinuous section of AR 17, where the route terminates.

History
Highway 152 was numbered as Arkansas Highway 82 from 1926 until 1933, when it was renumbered Arkansas Highway 152 to avoid conflict with the newly extended US 82.

Major intersections

See also

References

External links

152
Transportation in Arkansas County, Arkansas